Jim Koonce is an American gasser drag racer.

Driving a 1955 Chevrolet (with a transplanted Chevrolet engine), he won NHRA's C/G national championship at Detroit Dragway  in 1960.

References

Sources
Davis, Larry. Gasser Wars, North Branch, MN:  Cartech, 2003, p. 182.

Dragster drivers
American racing drivers